The Growlers are an American band that formed in 2006 in Dana Point, California. The band is composed of singer Brooks Nielsen, lead guitarist Matt Taylor and keyboard player/guitarist Kyle Straka. The Growlers have released six studio albums, four extended plays, one compilation album, and 10 singles. Three of their albums have charted in the Billboard charts.

The Growlers released their first album Are You In or Out? through Everloving Records in 2009 and their second album, Hot Tropics being released the following year.

Studio albums

Compilation albums

Extended plays

Singles

Music videos

References

External links 

Rock music group discographies